Sol Harris (born 19 March 1990) is a British producer, director, writer and podcaster. He is best known as the producer of feature film Finding Fatimah and as host of the weekly film podcast "Diminishing Returns".

Filmography

Writing
Harris worked with director, Oz Arshad, to develop the story and create the characters featured in Finding Fatimah before Arshad wrote the screenplay. Afterwards, Harris served as the film's script doctor.

Starting in 2017, Harris became a regular contributor to Starburst magazine. He has previously written about film and TV for the website WhatCulture.

Diminishing Returns podcast
In 2016, Harris launched the weekly film podcast, "Diminishing Returns", with co-hosts Calvin Dyson and Allen Turing. The show sees the hosts reviewing a film before pitching their own ideas for what the sequel should be.

The show was inspired by Dyson's webseries, "My Weekly Bond", in which he reviewed one James Bond film a week. As friends and film-fans, Dyson had pushed Harris to watch the James Bond series, with Harris generally being unimpressed. They decided to build a podcast around their resulting discussions, with the podcast repeatedly returning to the James Bond franchise as a result.

It has placed as highly as #3 in the UK TV & Film iTunes podcast chart.

The Simpsons

Sol achieved notoriety as a die-hard fan of The Simpsons after a chart he produced, showcasing the show's perceived decline, became popular. He had previously cited the show as a major influence on him.

He has since appeared on a variety of radio shows as a "Simpsons expert", including appearances on Dermot and Dave and RTÉ.

Note, the episode broadcast on 11 November 2001 is "The Parent Rap".

References

External links

 Sol Harris on Twitter

1990 births
Living people
British film directors
The Simpsons